Baytown Township is an urban township in Washington County, Minnesota, United States. The population was 1,533 at the 2000 census. The unincorporated community of Siegel is located within Baytown Township.

History
Baytown Township was organized in 1858, and named for a harbor on the St. Croix River.

Geography

Demographics
As of the census of 2000, there were 1,533 people, 492 households, and 435 families residing in the township. The racial makeup of the township was 95.56% White, 0.46% African American, 0.39% Native American, 1.96% Asian, 0.13% from other races, and 1.50% from two or more races. Hispanic or Latino of any race were 1.11% of the population.

There were 492 households, out of which 47.0% had children under the age of 18 living with them, 81.9% were married couples living together, 4.1% had a female householder with no husband present, and 11.4% were non-families. 8.9% of all households were made up of individuals, and 2.4% had someone living alone who was 65 years of age or older. The average household size was 3.12 and the average family size was 3.34.

In the township the population was spread out, with 31.4% under the age of 18, 5.9% from 18 to 24, 26.9% from 25 to 44, 29.9% from 45 to 64, and 5.9% who were 65 years of age or older. The median age was 39 years. For every 100 females, there were 107.2 males. For every 100 females age 18 and over, there were 102.1 males.

The median income for a household in the township was $99,362, and the median income for a family was $102,231. Males had a median income of $69,375 versus $38,750 for females. The per capita income for the township was $38,260. About 1.7% of families and 1.3% of the population were below the poverty line, including none of those under age 18 and 14.6% of those age 65 or over.

References

External links
 Baytown Township Official Site

Townships in Washington County, Minnesota
Townships in Minnesota